The International Society for Philosophy of Music Education (ISPME) is an international scholarly organization for the field of music education philosophy. Music education philosophy is a field of study that examines such fundamental questions as "why and how should music be taught and learned?," while ISPME is an international organization devoted specifically to this specialized subject. ISPME members include professors of music, education, and philosophy at universities in Europe, Asia, Oceania, and the Americas.

External links

Philosophy of Music Education Review

See also
Philosophy of education
Musicology
Sociomusicology
Aesthetics

References

Music education organizations
International cultural organizations